Jaroslav Bednář (born 9 November 1976) is a Czech professional ice hockey winger, who currently plays with HC Vrchlabí in the Czech.2 Liga

Playing career
Born in Prague, Czechoslovakia, Bednář began his career with Slavia Prague in 1994 and stayed there for three years before moving to rivals Sparta Prague. He played just 14 games before moving to Plzeň and then returned to play for Sparta for the next season. He then spent the next two seasons playing in Finland's SM-liiga with spells at Jyp and HIFK where he led the teams in goals and points.

NHL
Bednář was drafted 51st overall by the Los Angeles Kings in the 2001 NHL Entry Draft, but never managed to recapture the form he had in Finland.  He played 37 games for the Kings, scoring 4 goals and 11 assists for 15 points. On November 26, 2002, Bednář, along with Andreas Lilja was traded to the Florida Panthers for Dmitri Yushkevich, he played 65 games for Florida, scoring 6 goals and 14 assists for 20 points.  Overall, Bednář played 102 regular season games, scoring 10 goals and 25 assists for 35 points.

Return to Europe
Bednář moved to Russia during the cancelled 2004–05 NHL Season and played for Avangard Omsk where he played alongside Jaromír Jágr, Alexander Perezhogin and Oleg Tverdovsky.  In 2005, Bednář returned to Slavia Prague where he has become one of their core players and left the team after four years on 29 April 2009 to sign with Atlant Moscow of the Kontinental Hockey League. In 2010, Bednář signed a one-year contract with HC Davos from the Swiss NLA where he played alongside 3 other Czech players: Petr Sykora, Petr Taticek and Josef Marha. During the 2010–11 regular season, Bednář scored 35 goals and 15 assists for a total of 50 points in 43 games. On May 21, 2013, Bednar returned again to his original club, HC Slavia Praha for a fourth stint. He would play three seasons with HK Hradec Králové through to 2018.

Career statistics

Regular season and playoffs

International

References

External links

1976 births
Czech ice hockey right wingers
Czech expatriate ice hockey players in Russia
Avangard Omsk players
SC Bern players
HC Davos players
Florida Panthers players
HIFK (ice hockey) players
JYP Jyväskylä players
Living people
Los Angeles Kings draft picks
Los Angeles Kings players
HC Lugano players
Manchester Monarchs (AHL) players
Stadion Hradec Králové players
HC Plzeň players
Ice hockey people from Prague
San Antonio Rampage players
HC Slavia Praha players
HC Sparta Praha players
Torpedo Nizhny Novgorod players
Czech expatriate ice hockey players in Finland
Czech expatriate ice hockey players in the United States
Czech expatriate ice hockey players in Switzerland